Simon Fabio Stehle (born 17 September 2001) is a Spanish professional footballer who plays for Viktoria Köln, on loan from Hannover 96 as a winger.

Club career 
Stehle joined the youth division of Hannover 96 in 2017 after playing for the youth teams of Spanish clubs Atlético Madrid and Levante. He made his 2. Bundesliga debut on 9 February 2020 against Greuther Fürth. He substituted Cedric Teuchert in the 79th minute and marked the 3–1 final score in injury time.

Career statistics

References

External links
 

2001 births
Living people
German footballers
Spanish footballers
Association football wingers
Hannover 96 II players
Hannover 96 players
1. FC Kaiserslautern players
1. FC Kaiserslautern II players
FC Viktoria Köln players
2. Bundesliga players
3. Liga players
Regionalliga players